Rheon is both a surname and a given Welsh name. Notable people with the name include:

Iwan Rheon (born 1985), Welsh actor, singer, narrator, and musician
Rheon James (born 1992), Welsh rugby player

Welsh given names
Surnames of Welsh origin